Frank Sinatra: The Greatest Concerts is a five disc set compilation album of live concerts by Frank Sinatra from 1955 to 1981. A few bonus tracks are also included on each disc.

Track listing

Disc one (Tokyo, June 1962)
Featuring Bill Miller Sextet

Conducted by Bill Miller

For Mr. Sinatra:

Piano: Bill Miller * Bass: Ralph Peña * Drums: Irv Cottler *

Vibraphone: Emil Richards * Guitar: Al Viola * Saxophone: Harry Klee

 "Too Marvelous for Words" (Johnny Mercer, Richard A. Whiting)
 "Imagination" (Jimmy Van Heusen, Johnny Burke)
 "Moonlight in Vermont" (John Blackburn, Karl Suessdorf)
 "Day In, Day Out" (Rube Bloom, Mercer)
 "Without a Song" (Edward Eliscu, Billy Rose, Vincent Youmans)
 "The Moon Was Yellow (And the Night Is Young)" (Fred E. Ahlert, Edgar Leslie)
 "I've Got You Under My Skin" (Cole Porter)
 "At Long Last Love" (Porter)
 "My Funny Valentine" (Richard Rodgers, Lorenz Hart)
 "In the Still of the Night" (Porter)
 "Embraceable You" (George Gershwin, Ira Gershwin)
 "Night and Day" (Porter)
 "April in Paris" (Vernon Duke, E.Y. Harburg)
 "The Lady Is a Tramp" (Rodgers, Hart)
 Tokyo Monologue
 "All the Way" (Sammy Cahn, Van Heusen)
 "Chicago" (Fred Fisher)
 "I Could Have Danced All Night" (Alan Jay Lerner, Frederick Loewe)
 "New York, New York" (Fred Ebb, John Kander)
 "Come Fly with Me" (Cahn, Van Heusen)

Disc two (Melbourne, January 19, 1955)
 "I've Got the World on a String" (Harold Arlen, Ted Koehler)
 "I Get a Kick Out of You" (Porter)
 "My Funny Valentine"
 "Taking a Chance on Love" (Duke, Ted Fetter, John Latouche)
 "Three Coins in the Fountain" (Jule Styne, Cahn)
 "(I Got A Woman Crazy For Me) She's Funny That Way" (Neil Moret, Whiting)
 "Just One of Those Things" (Porter)
 "A Foggy Day" (G. Gershwin, I. Gershwin)
 "All of Me" (Gerald Marks, Seymour Simons)
 "Young at Heart" (Carolyn Leigh, Johnny Richards)
 "Nancy (With the Laughing Face)" (Phil Silvers, Van Heusen)
 "They Can't Take That Away from Me" (G. Gerhswin, I. Gershwin)
 "Ol' Man River"/National Anthem (Jerome Kern, Oscar Hammerstein II)
 "Our Town" [Bonus Track] (Cahn, Van Heusen)
 "Grovers Corners" [Bonus Track] (Cahn, Van Heusen)
 "The Impatient Years" [Bonus Track] (Cahn, Van Heusen)
 "Our Town" (Reprise) [Bonus Track]
 "Love and Marriage" [Bonus Track] (Cahn, Van Heusen)
 "Look to Your Heart" [Bonus Track] (Cahn, Van Heusen)
 Finale [Bonus Track]

Disc three (The White House, April 17, 1973)
Featuring United States Marine Band

Orchestra conducted by Nelson Riddle

For Mr. Sinatra:

Piano: Bill Miller * Drums: Irv Cottler *

Guitar: Al Viola 
 
 Introduction by Richard Nixon
 "You Make Me Feel So Young" (Josef Myrow, Mack Gordon)
 "Moonlight in Vermont"
 "One for My Baby (and One More for the Road)" (Arlen, Mercer)
 "I've Got You Under My Skin"
 "I Have Dreamed" (Rodgers, Hammerstein II)
 "Fly Me to the Moon" (Bart Howard)
 "Try a Little Tenderness" (Jimmy Campbell, Reginald Connelly, Harry M. Woods)
 "Ol' Man River"
 "I've Got the World on a String"
 "The House I Live In (That's America to Me)" (Lewis Allan, Earl Robinson)
 Thanks from President Nixon

Disc four (Caesars Palace, Lake Tahoe, February 12, 1981)
 "I've Got the World on a String"
 "You and Me (We Wanted It All)" (Carole Bayer Sager, Peter Allen)
 "The Best is Yet to Come" (Cy Coleman, Leigh)
 "Here's That Rainy Day" (Van Heusen, Burke)
 "Fly Me to the Moon"
 "Angel Eyes" (Matt Dennis, Tom Adair)
 A Toast to the Audience
 Teaching Brando to Sing
 "Luck Be a Lady" (Frank Loesser)
 "Send in the Clowns" (Stephen Sondheim)
 "I Get a Kick Out of You"
 "Where or When" (Rodgers, Hart)
 "I've Got You Under My Skin"
 "As Time Goes By" (Herman Hupfeld)
 "High Time" (Instrumental)
 A Brief Singing Lesson
 "Summer Me, Winter Me" (Marilyn Bergman, Alan Bergman, Michel Legrand)
 "New York, New York"
 "Lonely Town (Leonard Bernstein, Betty Comden, Adolph Green) (Live at the Reunion Arena, Dallas, Texas, October 24, 1987)
 "Moonlight in Vermont" (Live at the Reunion Arena, Dallas, Texas, October 24, 1987)

Disc five (Westchester Premiere Theater, April 1976)
 "Night and Day"
 "Where or When"
 "For Once in My Life" (Ron Miller, Orlando Murden)
 "The Lady Is a Tramp"
 "Imagination"
 "What's New?" (Bob Haggart, Burke)
 "Didn't We?" (Jimmy Webb)
 "Witchcraft" (Coleman, Leigh)
 "All By Myself" (Eric Carmen)
 Political Monologue
 "If" (David Gates)
 "The Hungry Years" (Neil Sedaka)
 "I've Got You Under My Skin"
 "Empty Tables" (Mercer, Van Heusen)
 "Send in the Clowns"
 "I Sing the Songs (I Write the Songs)" (Bruce Johnston)
 "My Kind of Town" (Cahn, Van Heusen)
 "My Way" (Paul Anka, Claude Francois, Jacques Revaux, Gilles Thibaut)
 Closing Theme

Personnel
 Frank Sinatra - vocals
 Bill Miller - Piano arrangements
 Vincent Falcone, Jr. - conductor, piano
 Al Viola - Guitar
 Tony Motolla - Guitar

Frank Sinatra live albums
2008 live albums
2008 compilation albums
Frank Sinatra compilation albums
Albums conducted by Nelson Riddle